The Devastators is the ninth novel in the Matt Helm spy series by Donald Hamilton. It was first published in 1965.

Plot summary
Matt Helm, code name "Eric", travels to London, England and eventually to Scotland in order to stop a mad scientist who plans to unleash a new Black Plague upon the world.

External links
Synopsis and summary

1965 American novels
Matt Helm novels